A skid loader, skid-steer loader, SSL, or skidsteer is any of a class of compact heavy equipment with lift arms that can attach to a wide variety of buckets and other labor-saving tools or attachments.

Skid-steer loaders are typically four-wheeled or tracked vehicles with the front and back wheels on each side mechanically linked together to turn at the same speed, and where the left-side drive wheels can be driven independently of the right-side drive wheels. This is accomplished by having two separate and independent transmissions; one for the left side wheels and one for the right side wheels. Earliest versions of skid steer loaders used forward and reverse clutch drives. Virtually all modern skid steers designed and built since the mid-1970s use two separate hydrostatic transmissions (one for the left side and one for the right side).

The wheels typically have no separate steering mechanism and hold a fixed straight alignment on the body of the machine. Turning is accomplished by differential steering, in which the left and right wheel pairs are operated at different speeds, and the machine turns by skidding or dragging its fixed-orientation wheels across the ground. Skid-steer loaders are capable of zero-radius turning, by driving one set of wheels forward while simultaneously driving the opposite set of wheels in reverse. This "zero-turn" capability (the machine can turn around within its own length) makes them extremely maneuverable and valuable for applications that require a compact, powerful and agile loader or tool carrier in confined-space work areas.

The extremely rigid frame and strong wheel bearings prevent the torsional forces caused by this dragging motion from damaging the machine. As with tracked vehicles, the high ground friction produced by skid steers can rip up soft or fragile road surfaces. They can be converted to low ground friction by using specially designed wheels such as the Mecanum wheel.

Skid-steer loaders are sometimes equipped with tracks instead of the wheels, and such a vehicle is known as a compact track loader.

Skid steer loaders, both wheel and track models, operate most efficiently when they are imbalanced - either the front wheels or the back wheels are more heavily loaded. When equipped with an empty bucket, skid steer loaders are all heavier in the rear and the rear wheels pivot in place while the front wheels slide around. When a bucket is fully loaded, the weight distribution reverses and the front wheels become significantly heavier than the rear wheels. When making a zero-turn while loaded, the front wheels pivot and the rear wheels slide.

Imbalanced operation reduces the amount of power required to turn the machine and minimizes tire wear. Skilled operators always try to keep the machine more heavily loaded on either the front or the rear of the machine. When the weight distribution is 50/50 (or close to it) neither the front set of wheels nor the rear set of wheels wants to pivot or slide and the machine starts to "buck" due to high friction, evenly divided between front and rear axles. Tire wear increases significantly in this condition.

Unlike in a conventional front loader, the lift arms in these machines are alongside the driver with the pivot points behind the driver's shoulders. Because of the operator's proximity to moving booms, early skid loaders were not as safe as conventional front loaders, particularly due to the lack of a rollover protection structure. Modern skid loaders have cabs, open or fully enclosed and other features to protect the operator. Like other front loaders, they can push material from one location to another, carry material in the bucket, load material into a truck or trailer and perform a variety of digging and grading operations.

History

The first three-wheeled, front-end loader was invented by brothers Cyril and Louis Keller in Rothsay, Minnesota, in 1957. The Kellers built the loader to help a farmer, Eddie Velo, mechanize the process of cleaning turkey manure from his barn. The light and compact machine, with its rear caster wheel, was able to turn around within its own length while performing the same tasks as a conventional front-end loader, hence its name.

The Melroe brothers, of Melroe Manufacturing Company in Gwinner, North Dakota, purchased the rights to the Keller loader in 1958 and hired the Kellers to continue refining their invention. As a result of this partnership, the M-200 Melroe self-propelled loader was introduced at the end of 1958. It featured two independent front-drive wheels and a rear caster wheel, a  engine and a  lift capacity. Two years later they replaced the caster wheel with a rear axle and introduced the M-400, the first four-wheel, true skid-steer loader. The M-440 was powered by a  engine and had an  rated operating capacity. Skid-steer development continued into the mid-1960s with the M600 loader.  Melroe adopted the well-known Bobcat trademark in 1962.

By the late 1960s, competing heavy equipment manufacturers were selling machines of this form factor.

Attachments

The conventional bucket of many skid loaders can be replaced with a variety of specialized buckets or attachments, many powered by the loader's hydraulic system. The list of attachments available is virtually endless. Some examples include backhoe, hydraulic breaker, pallet forks, angle broom, sweeper, auger, mower, snow blower, stump grinder, tree spade, trencher, dumping hopper, pavement miller, ripper, tillers, grapple, tilt, roller, snow blade, wheel saw, cement mixer, and wood chipper machine.

Some models of skid steer now also have an automatic attachment changer mechanism. This allows a driver to change between a variety of terrain handling, shaping, and leveling tools without having to leave the machine, by using a hydraulic control mechanism to latch onto the attachments. Traditionally hydraulic supply lines to powered attachments may be routed so that the couplings are located near the cab, and the driver does not need to leave the machine to connect or disconnect those supply lines. Recently, manufacturers have also created automatic hydraulic connection systems that allow changing attachments without having to manually disconnect/connect hydraulic lines

Loader-arm design

Radial lift

The original skid-steer loader arms were designed using a hinge near the top of the loader frame towers at the rear of the machine. When the loader arms were raised to pivot the loader arm up into the air in an arc that swings up over the top of the operator. This is known as a radial lift loader. This design is simple to manufacture and lower cost. Radial lift loaders start with the bucket close to the machine when the arms are fully down and start moving up and forward away from the machine as the arms are raised. This provides greater forward reach at mid-point in the lift for dumping at around four to five feet, but less stability at the middle of their lift arc (because the bucket is so much further forward). As the loader arms continue to raise past mid-height the bucket begins to move back closer to the machine and becomes more stable at full lift height, but also has far less forward reach at full height.

Radial lift machines are lower cost and tend to be preferred for users who do a lot of work at lower height of lift arms, such as digging and spreading materials at low heights.  Radial lift designs have very good lift capacity/stability when the loader arms are all the way down and become less stable (lower lift capacity) as the arms reach mid-point and the bucket is furthest forward. Static stability increases as the arms continue to rise, but raised loads are inherently less stable and safe for all machine types. One downside of radial lift design is that when fully-raised the bucket is back closer to the machine, so it has relatively poor reach when trying to load trucks or hoppers or spreaders. In addition, the bucket is almost over the operator's head and spillage over the back of the bucket can end up on top of the machine or in the operator's lap. Another downside of radial lift machines is that the large frame towers to which the loader arms are attached tend to restrict an operator's visibility to the rear and back corners of the machine. The radial arm is still the most common design and preferred by many users, but almost all manufacturers that started with radial lift designs began also producing "vertical lift" designs as well.

Vertical lift

"Vertical lift" designs use additional links and hinges on the loader arm, with the main pivot points towards the center or front of the machine. This allows the loader arm to have greater operating height and reach while retaining a compact design. There are no truly "vertical lift" designs in production. All loaders use multiple links (that all move in radial arcs) which aim to straighten the lift path of the bucket as it is raised. This allows close to vertical movement at points of the lift range, to keep the bucket forward of the operator's cab, allowing safe dumping into tall containers or vehicles. Some designs have more arc in the lowest part of the lift arc while other designs have more arc near the top of the lift arc.

One downside of vertical lift designs is somewhat higher cost and complexity of manufacturing. Some vertical lift designs may also have reduced rear or side visibility when the arms are down low, but superior visibility as the arms are raised (especially if the design does not require a large rear frame tower). Most Vertical lift machines provide more constant stability as the arms are raised from fully-lowered to fully-raised position since the bucket (load) has a similar distance from the machine from bottom to top of the lift path. As a side benefit to constant stability, most vertical lift machines have larger bucket capacities and longer, flatter low-profile buckets that can carry more material per cycle and tend to provide smoother excavating and grading than short-lip buckets. Vertical lift designs have grown rapidly in popularity in the past thirty years and now make up a significant proportion of new skid loader sales.

Applications

A skid-steer loader can sometimes be used in place of a large excavator by digging a hole from the inside.  This is especially true for digging swimming pools in a back yard where a large excavator cannot fit. The skid loader first digs a ramp leading to the edge of the desired excavation. It then uses the ramp to carry material out of the hole. The skid loader reshapes the ramp making it steeper and longer as the excavation deepens. This method is also useful for digging under a structure where overhead clearance does not allow for the boom of a large excavator, such as digging a basement under an existing house. Several companies make backhoe attachments for skid-steers. These are more effective for digging in a small area than the method above and can work in the same environments.

Other applications may consist of transporting raw material around a job site, either in buckets or using pallet forks. Rough terrain forklifts have very poor maneuverability; and smaller "material handling" forklifts have good maneuverability but poor traction. Skid steer loaders have very good maneuverability and traction but typically lower lift capacity than forklifts.

Skid steer loaders excel at snow removal, especially in smaller parking lots where maneuverability around existing cars, light poles, and curbs is an issue with larger snow plows. Skid steers also have the ability to actually remove the snow rather than just plowing it and pushing snow into a pile.

Manufacturers

Bobcat
Case
Caterpillar
CNH Industrial N.V.
Dingo Australia
Gehl Company
Hyundai
JCB
John Deere
Komatsu
KOBELCO Construction Machinery Co. Ltd
Kubota
LiuGong
Manitou Group
New Holland
Sany Group Co. Ltd
Takeuchi
Terex
Toro
Toyota Industries
Volvo
Wacker Neuson
Yanmar

See also

 Compact excavator
 Backhoe loader
 Bulldozer
 Forestry mulcher
 Crane
 Excavator
 Forklift
 Grader
 Front loader
 Amphibious vehicle
 Skid-to-turn
 Tractor
 Continuous track
 Telescopic handler

References

Bibliography

External links

 How Skid Steer Loaders and Multi Terrain Loaders work – from HowStuffWorks.com
 Preventing Injuries and Deaths from Skid Steer Loaders. U.S. National Institute for Occupational Safety and Health Alert from December 2010.
 Preventing Injuries and Deaths from Skid Steer Loaders. U.S. National Institute for Occupational Safety and Health Alert from February 1998.
 Skid Steer Loader Safety from Kansas State University
  "8th-grade grads invented, Ph.D.s explained their inspirations," by Edward Lotterman, St. Paul Pioneer Press, July 15, 2010

Agricultural machinery
Construction equipment
Engineering vehicles
American inventions